Russell Wookey (born March 13, 1953) is a Canadian curler. He won the  playing lead on the Mike Riley rink.  

At the time of the 1984 Brier, Wookey was employed as a lawyer.

Teams

References

External links 

 Russ Wookey – Curling Canada Stats Archive
 "Riley Appreciates Rest, Wendorf" - The Phoenix, April 7, 1984
 "Riley Finally Emerges" - The Leader Post, March 12, 1984 (section B, page B1)

1953 births
Living people
Canadian male curlers
Brier champions
Curlers from Manitoba
Lawyers in Manitoba
Place of birth missing (living people)